Giannis Katemis (born 28 May 1977) is a retired Greek professional football defender.

Career
Born in Limnes, Argolis, Katemis began his football career with Panargiakos F.C. in the Beta Ethniki. He would play in the Alpha Ethniki for Chalkidona F.C. and Atromitos F.C. before moving to the lower levels of Greek football.

References
Profile at Onsports.gr
https://web.archive.org/web/20110714093122/http://www.mikriliga.com/portal/arthro.php?id=1536

1977 births
Living people
Greek footballers
Panetolikos F.C. players
Atromitos F.C. players
Chalkidona F.C. players
Panargiakos F.C. players
Ilioupoli F.C. players
Association football defenders
Footballers from the Peloponnese
People from Argos-Mykines